The Juan de Fuca Plate is a small tectonic plate (microplate) generated from the Juan de Fuca Ridge that is subducting beneath the northerly portion of the western side of the North American Plate at the Cascadia subduction zone. It is named after the explorer of the same name. One of the smallest of Earth's tectonic plates, the Juan de Fuca Plate is a remnant part of the once-vast Farallon Plate, which is now largely subducted underneath the North American Plate.

In plate tectonic reconstructions, the Juan de Fuca Plate is referred to as the Vancouver Plate between the break-up of the Farallon Plate  55–52 Ma and the activation of the San Andreas Fault c. 30 Ma.

Origins 
The Juan de Fuca Plate system has its origins with Panthalassa's oceanic basin and crust. This oceanic crust has primarily been subducted under the North American Plate, and the Eurasian Plate. Panthalassa's oceanic plate remnants are understood to be the Juan de Fuca, Gorda, Cocos and the Nazca plates, all four of which were part of the Farallon Plate.

Extent 

The Juan de Fuca Plate is bounded on the south by the Blanco Fracture Zone (running northwest off the coast of Oregon), on the north by the Nootka Fault (running southwest off Nootka Island, near Vancouver Island, British Columbia) and along the west by the Pacific Plate (which covers most of the Pacific Ocean and is the largest of Earth's tectonic plates). The Juan de Fuca Plate itself has since fractured into three pieces, and the name is applied to the entire plate in some references, but in others only to the central portion. The three fragments are differentiated as such: the piece to the south is known as the Gorda Plate and the piece to the north is known as the Explorer Plate. The separate pieces are demarcated by the large offsets of the undersea spreading zone.

Volcanism 
This subducting plate system has formed the Cascade Range, the Cascade Volcanic Arc, and the Pacific Ranges, along the west coast of North America from southern British Columbia to northern California. These in turn are part of the Pacific Ring of Fire, a much larger-scale volcanic feature that extends around much of the rim of the Pacific Ocean.

Earthquakes
The last megathrust earthquake at the Cascadia subduction zone was the 1700 Cascadia earthquake, estimated to have a moment magnitude of 8.7 to 9.2. Based on carbon dating of local tsunami deposits, it is inferred to have occurred around 1700. Evidence of this earthquake is also seen in the ghost forest along the bank of the Copalis River in Washington. The rings of the dead trees indicate that they died around 1700, and it is believed that they were killed when the earthquake occurred and sank the ground beneath them causing the trees to be flooded by saltwater. Japanese records indicate that a tsunami occurred in Japan on 26 January 1700, which was likely caused by this earthquake.

In 2008, small earthquakes were observed within the Juan de Fuca Plate. The unusual quakes were described as "more than 600 quakes over the past 10 days in a basin 150 miles [240 km] southwest of Newport". The quakes were unlike most quakes in that they did not follow the pattern of a large quake, followed by smaller aftershocks; rather, they were simply a continual deluge of small quakes. Furthermore, they did not occur on the tectonic plate boundary, but rather in the middle of the plate. The subterranean quakes were detected on hydrophones, and scientists described the sounds as similar to thunder, and unlike anything previously recorded.

Carbon sequestration potential
The basaltic formations of the Juan de Fuca Plate could potentially be suitable for long-term CO2 sequestration as part of a carbon capture and storage (CCS) system. Injection of CO2 would lead to the formation of stable carbonates. It is estimated that 100 years of US carbon emissions (at current rate) could be stored securely, without risk of leakage back into the atmosphere.

Tearing
According to William B. Hawley and Richard M. Allen, the authors of the study, the hole may be the cause of volcanism and earthquakes on the plate, and is causing deformation of the offshore part of the plate. The deformation may cause the plate to fragment, with the remaining un-subducted small pieces becoming attached to other plates nearby.

See also
Astoria Fan
Cascadia Channel
Geology of the Pacific Northwest
Plate tectonics

References

External links
National Geographic on Japanese records verifying an American earthquake
Cascadia tectonic history with map

Tectonic plates
Geology of the Pacific Ocean